Krasnoye Znamya (Красное Знамя, Red Banner, ex-Khrabryy) was a Soviet gunboat. The ship had been built in the late 19th century as the Khrabryy (Храбрый, Brave) by the Russian Empire. The ship was the only craft of its class. The Krasnoye Znamya was sunk in the harbour of Lavansaari in the Gulf of Finland on November 18, 1942 after an attack by Finnish MTBs.

The sinking of Krasnoye Znamya

During World War I Khrabryy participated in the battles in the Baltic Sea. It was lightly damaged during the Battle of Moon Sound in 1917. On December 31, 1922 the ship was renamed to Krasnoye Znamya.

After the Moscow Peace Treaty of 1940 between Finland and the Soviet Union, the island of Lavansaari had been handed over to the Soviets. During the Continuation War the island was a Soviet naval base and housed a radar station. On November 18, 1942 the three Finnish motor torpedo boats Syöksy, Vinha and Vihuri, as well as a minelaying KM-boat made an assault on the harbour of Lavansaari. Syöksy managed to hit the Krasnoye Znamya with one torpedo. She was sunk in her moorings. Commanding officer of Syöksy, lieutenant commander Jouko Pirhonen was awarded the Mannerheim Cross for the successful attack.

The Krasnoye Znamya was salvaged on November 13, 1943 and recommissioned on September 17, 1944. She was finally decommissioned in 1960.

References

World War II naval ships of the Soviet Union
1895 ships
Gunboats
Shipwrecks in the Gulf of Finland
Maritime incidents in November 1942
World War II shipwrecks in the Baltic Sea
World War I naval ships of Russia